The 2009 Ulster Senior Club Football Championship was the 42nd staging of the annual Ulster Senior Club Football Championship which is administered by Ulster GAA. Nine GAA county boards compete for the title. The winners were awarded the Séamus McFerran Cup and went on to compete in the 2010 All-Ireland Senior Club Football Championship. The championship started on 18 October 2009 and concluded with the final on 29 November 2009.

Crossmaglen were the current holders - beating Ballinderry in the 2008 final at Brewster Park in Enniskillen, County Fermanagh.

Format
The championship took the structure of an open-draw knock-out.

Competing teams
Each county in Ulster holds its own County Championship. The winner of the nine championships qualify for the Ulster Club Championship.

Draw
The draw for the (whole) competition took place in August 2009, along with the draws for the Ulster Senior Hurling, Intermediate Football and Junior Football championships.

Match schedule

Preliminary round - 18 October
Quarter-finals - 1 November
Semi-finals - 15 November
Final - 29 November

Preliminary round

Quarter-finals
The quarter-finals were originally schedules to take place on 1 November, but they were all postponed for a week due to adverse weather conditions.

Semi-finals

Final

Bracket

References

External links
 Ulster GAA website

Ulster Senior Club Football Championship
Gaelic
Ulster Senior Club Football Championship